AlefBase is the second album by the Israeli metal band Gevolt. Released on 25 March 2011, the album was the first full-length metal album in Yiddish language. All tracks are based on Yiddish folk songs such as Tum Balalayke and Zog Nit Keyn Mol.

The album's genre was declared as Yiddish Metal, but it has also been described as Neue Deutsche Härte.

AlefBase was available for free download on Gevolt's website for free on 25 February 2011, one month before the official release date. The free download remained for several years thereafter.

The album was released to positive reception in both music media and Jewish media. Such sources as American newspaper The Forward and German Die Welt mentioned the new phenomenon of Yiddish metal in their articles.

The track "Bay Mir Bistu Sheyn" was featured in April 2011 by Music Alliance Pact.

In 2016, AlefBase was inducted into the Freedman Jewish Sound Archive at the University of Pennsylvania's Van Pelt Library.

Track listing

Personnel

Band members
 Anatholy Bonder − vocals
 Michael Gimmervert − guitars, strange banjo
 Mark Lekhovitser − bass guitars
 Vadim Weinstein − drums
 Dmitry Lifshitz − keyboards
 Eva Yefremov − violins

Guest musicians
 Yevgeny Kushnir − clean guitars/guitar FX on 5, 6, 7, 8, 9, 11 / oud on 11 / Help in arrangements in 1, 2, 4, 5, 6, 7, 8, 9, 11
 Max Mann − bass guitars on 1, 2, 4, 5, 6, 7, 8, 9, 11 / Help in arrangements in 1, 2, 4, 5, 6, 7, 8, 9, 11
 Marina Klionski − Help in arrangements in 5, 6, 8
 Anna Agre − Help in arrangements in 2, 4, 8, 9
 Oleg Szumski − drums adds on 5, 8 / Help in arrangements in 5, 8

Production
 Recorded in "Muzikansky" studio (Ashdod, Israel), "Tsolelet" studio (Tel Aviv, Israel), "Soundroll" studio (Givataim, Israel) and "Taketwoo" studio (Kiryat Ono, Israel), 2005–2010
 Produced by Gevolt
 Engineered by Gevolt
 Mixed and premastered by Gevolt, 2010–2011
 Illustrations concept by Leonid Polonsky
 Art and design by Mark Lekhovitser
 Yiddish consulting by Leybl Botwinik

References

External links 
 AlefBase at Gevolt's official site. 
 AlefBase at Soundcloud.
 "AlefBase", Encyclopaedia Metallum, 26 February 2011. Retrieved on 26 February 2011.
 Megen, Aleks. "AlefBase Review" Evrofilm.com, 4 September 2012. Retrieved on 4 September 2012.
 Brushvox, Attila. "AlefBase Review", 26 July 2011.

2011 albums
Gevolt albums
Yiddish culture in Israel
Yiddish-language albums